Caropodium is a genus of flowering plants belonging to the family Apiaceae.

Its native range is Turkey to Iran.

Species:

Caropodium haussknechtii 
Caropodium platycarpum 
Caropodium pterocarpum

References

Apiaceae
Apiaceae genera